The 1st constituency of the Pyrénées-Orientales (French: Première circonscription des Pyrénées-Orientales) is a French legislative constituency in the Pyrénées-Orientales département. Like the other 576 French constituencies, it elects one MP using the two-round system, with a run-off if no candidate receives over 50% of the vote in the first round.

Description

The 1st constituency of Pyrénées-Orientales mainly consists of the majority Perpignan, which is shared with Pyrénées-Orientales's 3rd constituency and Pyrénées-Orientales's 2nd constituency. The seat also includes the town of Toulouges just to the west of the city.

The constituency has vacillated between left and right, however in 2017 the voters opted for centrist En Marche! over the far right National Front in the second round. The Republicans trailed in 3rd in the 1st round and there was no candidate from the PSdespite them winning the seat in the previous election.

Assembly Members

Election results

2022

 
 
 
 
 
 
 
|-
| colspan="8" bgcolor="#E9E9E9"|
|-

2017

|- style="background-color:#E9E9E9;text-align:center;"
! colspan="2" rowspan="2" style="text-align:left;" | Candidate
! rowspan="2" colspan="2" style="text-align:left;" | Party
! colspan="2" | 1st round
! colspan="2" | 2nd round
|- style="background-color:#E9E9E9;text-align:center;"
! width="75" | Votes
! width="30" | %
! width="75" | Votes
! width="30" | %
|-
| style="background-color:" |
| style="text-align:left;" | Romain Grau
| style="text-align:left;" | La République En Marche!
| LREM
| 
| 31.75
| 
| 57.21
|-
| style="background-color:" |
| style="text-align:left;" | Alexandre Bolo
| style="text-align:left;" | National Front
| FN
| 
| 20.26
| 
| 42.79
|-
| style="background-color:" |
| style="text-align:left;" | Daniel Mach
| style="text-align:left;" | The Republicans
| LR
| 
| 19.36
| colspan="2" style="text-align:left;" |
|-
| style="background-color:" |
| style="text-align:left;" | Alain Mih
| style="text-align:left;" | La France Insoumise
| FI
| 
| 11.56
| colspan="2" style="text-align:left;" |
|-
| style="background-color:" |
| style="text-align:left;" | Jean Codognès
| style="text-align:left;" | Miscellaneous Left
| DVG
| 
| 5.73
| colspan="2" style="text-align:left;" |
|-
| style="background-color:" |
| style="text-align:left;" | Françoise Fiter
| style="text-align:left;" | Communist Party
| PCF
| 
| 4.30
| colspan="2" style="text-align:left;" |
|-
| style="background-color:" |
| style="text-align:left;" | Fabienne Meyer
| style="text-align:left;" | Regionalist
| REG
| 
| 2.93
| colspan="2" style="text-align:left;" |
|-
| style="background-color:" |
| style="text-align:left;" | Philippe Symphorien
| style="text-align:left;" | Debout la France
| DLF
| 
| 1.22
| colspan="2" style="text-align:left;" |
|-
| style="background-color:" |
| style="text-align:left;" | Emmanuel Cousty
| style="text-align:left;" | Independent
| DIV
| 
| 1.14
| colspan="2" style="text-align:left;" |
|-
| style="background-color:" |
| style="text-align:left;" | Pascale Advenard
| style="text-align:left;" | Far Left
| EXG
| 
| 0.75
| colspan="2" style="text-align:left;" |
|-
| style="background-color:" |
| style="text-align:left;" | Nicolas Perez
| style="text-align:left;" | Independent
| DIV
| 
| 0.56
| colspan="2" style="text-align:left;" |
|-
| style="background-color:" |
| style="text-align:left;" | Lionel Monaco
| style="text-align:left;" | Miscellaneous Left
| DVG
| 
| 0.23
| colspan="2" style="text-align:left;" |
|-
| style="background-color:" |
| style="text-align:left;" | Anthony Rhighi
| style="text-align:left;" | Independent
| DIV
| 
| 0.21
| colspan="2" style="text-align:left;" |
|-
| colspan="8" style="background-color:#E9E9E9;"|
|- style="font-weight:bold"
| colspan="4" style="text-align:left;" | Total
| 
| 100%
| 
| 100%
|-
| colspan="8" style="background-color:#E9E9E9;"|
|-
| colspan="4" style="text-align:left;" | Registered voters
| 
| style="background-color:#E9E9E9;"|
| 
| style="background-color:#E9E9E9;"|
|-
| colspan="4" style="text-align:left;" | Blank/Void ballots
| 
| 2.28%
| 
| 10.84%
|-
| colspan="4" style="text-align:left;" | Turnout
| 
| 47.02%
| 
| 40.66%
|-
| colspan="4" style="text-align:left;" | Abstentions
| 
| 52.98%
| 
| 59.34%
|-
| colspan="8" style="background-color:#E9E9E9;"|
|- style="font-weight:bold"
| colspan="6" style="text-align:left;" | Result
| colspan="2" style="background-color:" | REM GAIN FROM PS
|}

2012

|- style="background-color:#E9E9E9;text-align:center;"
! colspan="2" rowspan="2" style="text-align:left;" | Candidate
! rowspan="2" colspan="2" style="text-align:left;" | Party
! colspan="2" | 1st round
! colspan="2" | 2nd round
|- style="background-color:#E9E9E9;text-align:center;"
! width="75" | Votes
! width="30" | %
! width="75" | Votes
! width="30" | %
|-
| style="background-color:" |
| style="text-align:left;" | Daniel Mach
| style="text-align:left;" | Union for a Popular Movement
| UMP
| 
| 28.19
| 
| 33.82
|-
| style="background-color:" |
| style="text-align:left;" | Jacques Cresta
| style="text-align:left;" | Socialist Party
| PS
| 
| 24.62
| 
| 42.95
|-
| style="background-color:" |
| style="text-align:left;" | Louis Aliot
| style="text-align:left;" | National Front
| FN
| 
| 24.13
| 
| 23.24
|-
| style="background-color:" |
| style="text-align:left;" | Jean Vila
| style="text-align:left;" | Left Front
| FG
| 
| 16.35
| colspan="2" style="text-align:left;" |
|-
| style="background-color:" |
| style="text-align:left;" | Agnès Langevine
| style="text-align:left;" | Europe Ecology-The Greens
| EELV
| 
| 1.73
| colspan="2" style="text-align:left;" |
|-
| style="background-color:" |
| style="text-align:left;" | Christine Espert
| style="text-align:left;" | The Centre for France
| CEN
| 
| 1.28
| colspan="2" style="text-align:left;" |
|-
| style="background-color:" |
| style="text-align:left;" | Atika El Bourimi
| style="text-align:left;" | Miscellaneous Left
| DVG
| 
| 1.13
| colspan="2" style="text-align:left;" |
|-
| style="background-color:" |
| style="text-align:left;" | Jean-Paul Tomas
| style="text-align:left;" | Ecologist
| ECO
| 
| 0.84
| colspan="2" style="text-align:left;" |
|-
| style="background-color:" |
| style="text-align:left;" | Pierre Verdier
| style="text-align:left;" | Far Right
| EXD
| 
| 0.43
| colspan="2" style="text-align:left;" |
|-
| style="background-color:" |
| style="text-align:left;" | Laurent Gomez
| style="text-align:left;" | Other
| AUT
| 
| 0.33
| colspan="2" style="text-align:left;" |
|-
| style="background-color:" |
| style="text-align:left;" | Stéphanie Font
| style="text-align:left;" | Far Left
| EXG
| 
| 0.32
| colspan="2" style="text-align:left;" |
|-
| style="background-color:" |
| style="text-align:left;" | Hélène Sarraseca
| style="text-align:left;" | Ecologist
| ECO
| 
| 0.30
| colspan="2" style="text-align:left;" |
|-
| style="background-color:" |
| style="text-align:left;" | Pascale Advenard
| style="text-align:left;" | Far Left
| EXG
| 
| 0.25
| colspan="2" style="text-align:left;" |
|-
| style="background-color:" |
| style="text-align:left;" | Annie Marciniak
| style="text-align:left;" | Other
| AUT
| 
| 0.10
| colspan="2" style="text-align:left;" |
|-
| style="background-color:" |
| style="text-align:left;" | Roymond Faura
| style="text-align:left;" | Miscellaneous Left
| DVG
| 
| 0.00
| colspan="2" style="text-align:left;" |
|-
| style="background-color:" |
| style="text-align:left;" | Michael Morant
| style="text-align:left;" | Ecologist
| ECO
| 
| 0.00
| colspan="2" style="text-align:left;" |
|-
| colspan="8" style="background-color:#E9E9E9;"|
|- style="font-weight:bold"
| colspan="4" style="text-align:left;" | Total
| 
| 100%
| 
| 100%
|-
| colspan="8" style="background-color:#E9E9E9;"|
|-
| colspan="4" style="text-align:left;" | Registered voters
| 
| style="background-color:#E9E9E9;"|
| 
| style="background-color:#E9E9E9;"|
|-
| colspan="4" style="text-align:left;" | Blank/Void ballots
| 
| 1.31%
| 
| 2.23%
|-
| colspan="4" style="text-align:left;" | Turnout
| 
| 58.99%
| 
| 60.24%
|-
| colspan="4" style="text-align:left;" | Abstentions
| 
| 41.01%
| 
| 39.76%
|-
| colspan="8" style="background-color:#E9E9E9;"|
|- style="font-weight:bold"
| colspan="6" style="text-align:left;" | Result
| colspan="2" style="background-color:" | PS GAIN FROM UMP
|}

2007

|- style="background-color:#E9E9E9;text-align:center;"
! colspan="2" rowspan="2" style="text-align:left;" | Candidate
! rowspan="2" colspan="2" style="text-align:left;" | Party
! colspan="2" | 1st round
! colspan="2" | 2nd round
|- style="background-color:#E9E9E9;text-align:center;"
! width="75" | Votes
! width="30" | %
! width="75" | Votes
! width="30" | %
|-
| style="background-color:" |
| style="text-align:left;" | Daniel Mach
| style="text-align:left;" | Union for a Presidential Majority
| UMP
| 
| 46.56
| 
| 56.98
|-
| style="background-color:" |
| style="text-align:left;" | Jean Vila
| style="text-align:left;" | Communist Party
| PCF
| 
| 16.44
| 
| 43.02
|-
| style="background-color:" |
| style="text-align:left;" | Martine Joseph
| style="text-align:left;" | Socialist Party
| PS
| 
| 14.80
| colspan="2" style="text-align:left;" |
|-
| style="background-color:" |
| style="text-align:left;" | Louis Aliot
| style="text-align:left;" | National Front
| FN
| 
| 2,599
| colspan="2" style="text-align:left;" |
|-
| style="background-color:" |
| style="text-align:left;" | Chantal Gombert
| style="text-align:left;" | UDF-Democratic Movement
| UDF-MoDem
| 
| 6.12
| colspan="2" style="text-align:left;" |
|-
| style="background-color:" |
| style="text-align:left;" | Guillem Vaulato
| style="text-align:left;" | Far Left
| EXG
| 
| 1.82
| colspan="2" style="text-align:left;" |
|-
| style="background-color:" |
| style="text-align:left;" | Nicole Drickx
| style="text-align:left;" | The Greens
| LV
| 
| 1.57
| colspan="2" style="text-align:left;" |
|-
| style="background-color:" |
| style="text-align:left;" | Virginie Barre
| style="text-align:left;" | Regionalist
| REG
| 
| 1.49
| colspan="2" style="text-align:left;" |
|-
| style="background-color:" |
| style="text-align:left;" | Christine Gonzalez
| style="text-align:left;" | Movement for France
| MPF
| 
| 1.15
| colspan="2" style="text-align:left;" |
|-
| style="background-color:" |
| style="text-align:left;" | Yves Castanet
| style="text-align:left;" | Ecologist
| ECO
| 
| 1.04
| colspan="2" style="text-align:left;" |
|-
| style="background-color:" |
| style="text-align:left;" | Monique Juanola
| style="text-align:left;" | Regionalist
| REG
| 
| 0.64
| colspan="2" style="text-align:left;" |
|-
| style="background-color:" |
| style="text-align:left;" | Pascale Advenard
| style="text-align:left;" | Far Left
| EXG
| 
| 0.62
| colspan="2" style="text-align:left;" |
|-
| style="background-color:" |
| style="text-align:left;" | Ida Fleury
| style="text-align:left;" | Far Right
| EXD
| 
| 0.56
| colspan="2" style="text-align:left;" |
|-
| style="background-color:" |
| style="text-align:left;" | Francis Meuley
| style="text-align:left;" | Independent
| DIV
| 
| 0.45
| colspan="2" style="text-align:left;" |
|-
| style="background-color:" |
| style="text-align:left;" | Annie Marciniak
| style="text-align:left;" | Independent
| DIV
| 
| 0.01
| colspan="2" style="text-align:left;" |
|-
| colspan="8" style="background-color:#E9E9E9;"|
|- style="font-weight:bold"
| colspan="4" style="text-align:left;" | Total
| 
| 100%
| 
| 100%
|-
| colspan="8" style="background-color:#E9E9E9;"|
|-
| colspan="4" style="text-align:left;" | Registered voters
| 
| style="background-color:#E9E9E9;"|
| 
| style="background-color:#E9E9E9;"|
|-
| colspan="4" style="text-align:left;" | Blank/Void ballots
| 
| 1.68%
| 
| 3.48%
|-
| colspan="4" style="text-align:left;" | Turnout
| 
| 59.19%
| 
| 58.80%
|-
| colspan="4" style="text-align:left;" | Abstentions
| 
| 40.81%
| 
| 41.20%
|-
| colspan="8" style="background-color:#E9E9E9;"|
|- style="font-weight:bold"
| colspan="6" style="text-align:left;" | Result
| colspan="2" style="background-color:" | UMP HOLD
|}

2002

|- style="background-color:#E9E9E9;text-align:center;"
! colspan="2" rowspan="2" style="text-align:left;" | Candidate
! rowspan="2" colspan="2" style="text-align:left;" | Party
! colspan="2" | 1st round
! colspan="2" | 2nd round
|- style="background-color:#E9E9E9;text-align:center;"
! width="75" | Votes
! width="30" | %
! width="75" | Votes
! width="30" | %
|-
| style="background-color:" |
| style="text-align:left;" | Daniel Mach
| style="text-align:left;" | Union for a Presidential Majority
| UMP
| 
| 35.71
| 
| 55.74
|-
| style="background-color:" |
| style="text-align:left;" | Jean Vila
| style="text-align:left;" | Communist Party
| PCF
| 
| 32.19
| 
| 44.26
|-
| style="background-color:" |
| style="text-align:left;" | Louis Aliot
| style="text-align:left;" | National Front
| FN
| 
| 19.47
| colspan="2" style="text-align:left;" |
|-
| style="background-color:" |
| style="text-align:left;" | J. Claude Kaiser
| style="text-align:left;" | Rally for France
| RFP
| 
| 2.20
| colspan="2" style="text-align:left;" |
|-
| style="background-color:" |
| style="text-align:left;" | Claudine Coste
| style="text-align:left;" | Revolutionary Communist League
| LCR
| 
| 1.86
| colspan="2" style="text-align:left;" |
|-
| style="background-color:" |
| style="text-align:left;" | François Feillard
| style="text-align:left;" | Independent
| DIV
| 
| 1.47
| colspan="2" style="text-align:left;" |
|-
| style="background-color:" |
| style="text-align:left;" | Alain Dosseur Le
| style="text-align:left;" | Republican Pole
| PR
| 
| 1.26
| colspan="2" style="text-align:left;" |
|-
| style="background-color:" |
| style="text-align:left;" | Pierre Gonzalez
| style="text-align:left;" | Hunting, Fishing, Nature and Traditions
| CPNT
| 
| 1.25
| colspan="2" style="text-align:left;" |
|-
| style="background-color:" |
| style="text-align:left;" | Caroline Poupard
| style="text-align:left;" | Workers' Struggle
| LO
| 
| 0.86
| colspan="2" style="text-align:left;" |
|-
| style="background-color:" |
| style="text-align:left;" | Michel Dallee
| style="text-align:left;" | National Republican Movement
| MNR
| 
| 0.82
| colspan="2" style="text-align:left;" |
|-
| style="background-color:" |
| style="text-align:left;" | Christine Gonzalez
| style="text-align:left;" | Movement for France
| MPF
| 
| 0.76
| colspan="2" style="text-align:left;" |
|-
| style="background-color:" |
| style="text-align:left;" | Isabelle Duran
| style="text-align:left;" | Regionalist
| REG
| 
| 0.66
| colspan="2" style="text-align:left;" |
|-
| style="background-color:" |
| style="text-align:left;" | Jacques Cros
| style="text-align:left;" | Independent
| DIV
| 
| 0.58
| colspan="2" style="text-align:left;" |
|-
| style="background-color:" |
| style="text-align:left;" | Gauderique Delcasso
| style="text-align:left;" | Ecologist
| ECO
| 
| 0.56
| colspan="2" style="text-align:left;" |
|-
| style="background-color:" |
| style="text-align:left;" | Louis Pomata
| style="text-align:left;" | Independent
| DIV
| 
| 0.35
| colspan="2" style="text-align:left;" |
|-
| style="background-color:" |
| style="text-align:left;" | Alain Cavaliere
| style="text-align:left;" | Miscellaneous Right
| DVD
| 
| 0.00
| colspan="2" style="text-align:left;" |
|-
| style="background-color:" |
| style="text-align:left;" | Jacques Comas
| style="text-align:left;" | Independent
| DIV
| 
| 0.00
| colspan="2" style="text-align:left;" |
|-
| style="background-color:" |
| style="text-align:left;" | Nicole Sabiols
| style="text-align:left;" | Socialist Party
| PS
| 
| 0.00
| colspan="2" style="text-align:left;" |
|-
| colspan="8" style="background-color:#E9E9E9;"|
|- style="font-weight:bold"
| colspan="4" style="text-align:left;" | Total
| 
| 100%
| 
| 100%
|-
| colspan="8" style="background-color:#E9E9E9;"|
|-
| colspan="4" style="text-align:left;" | Registered voters
| 
| style="background-color:#E9E9E9;"|
| 
| style="background-color:#E9E9E9;"|
|-
| colspan="4" style="text-align:left;" | Blank/Void ballots
| 
| 2.37%
| 
| 4.63%
|-
| colspan="4" style="text-align:left;" | Turnout
| 
| 64.46%
| 
| 62.15%
|-
| colspan="4" style="text-align:left;" | Abstentions
| 
| 35.54%
| 
| 37.85%
|-
| colspan="8" style="background-color:#E9E9E9;"|
|- style="font-weight:bold"
| colspan="6" style="text-align:left;" | Result
| colspan="2" style="background-color:" | UMP GAIN FROM PCF
|}

References

1